"Breaking Me" is a song by German DJ Topic and Swedish singer A7S. It was released on 19 December 2019 through Virgin and Universal. Since its release, the song became Topic's signature song and biggest hit single to date, reaching number one in Belgium (Wallonia)'s Ultratop chart, Israel, Portugal, and Romania, as well as the top 10 in many other countries, including Australia, Canada, Germany, Ireland, the Netherlands, New Zealand and the United Kingdom. The video for the song was shot in several locations around Lisbon, Portugal, mainly Cais do Sodré pink street, Santa Justa Lift and LX Factory.

"Breaking Me" was nominated for Top Dance/Electronic Song at the Billboard Music Awards, but lost to "Roses" by Saint Jhn.

Background
Talking about the song, the artists revealed that it's the "sweet spot between a heartache and energetic beats". According to Topic, the song "is about a situation in a relationship with a certain dependency, in which one always gives a little more and "breaks" because of that". The song was written during songwriting sessions in Berlin and Miami over the course of two months.

Critical reception
Rachel Kupfer of EDM described the song as "vaguely tropical house" which is made for "both dimly lit dance floors and pop-inspired festival sets". He also noted how much A7S's vocals "match a bouncy bass line and clubby synths". Critics also cited the fact that despite A7S' anonymity, the song all the more benefits from the hook sung by the Swedish artist.

Charts

Weekly charts

Year-end charts

Certifications

Release history

See also
List of Airplay 100 number ones of the 2020s
List of German airplay number-one songs of 2020
List of number-one singles of 2020 (Portugal)

References

2019 songs
2019 singles
Topic (DJ) songs
Ultratop 50 Singles (Wallonia) number-one singles
Number-one singles in Israel
Number-one singles in Portugal
Number-one singles in Romania
Songs about heartache
Songs written by A7S
Songs written by Topic (DJ)
Torch songs